Holzmaden is a town in Baden-Württemberg, Germany that lies between Stuttgart and Ulm.
Holzmaden is 4 km south-east from Kirchheim unter Teck and 19 km south-east of Esslingen am Neckar. The A 8 runs south from Holzmaden. The town and surrounding area are well known as the source of exceptionally well-preserved fossils from the Jurassic period.

Demographics

1=census results

Mayors 
 Christian Burkhardt (1945–1952)
 Otto Vogt (1952–1982)
 Jürgen Berner (1982–1998)
 Jürgen Riehle (1998–2014)
 Susanne Jakob (2014–2021)
 Florian Schepp (since 2021)

Infrastructure and facilities
The community is located north of the Bundesautobahn 8, halfway between Ulm and Stuttgart; the next junction is Aichelberg.

The railway Kirchheim (Teck) Süd-Weilheim (Teck) connected Holzmaden to the railway network. Passenger traffic was discontinued in 1982 and freight in 1995.
Holzmaden also has a primary school, two kindergartens, a community hall with integrally joined forming gym and a sports and leisure facility.

Associations and Organizations
The association's work is an essential factor in the social life in Holzmaden.

Notable people from Holzmaden
 Bernhard Hauff (1866–1950), founder of museum Hauff
 Heinz Kälberer (born 1942), former Lord mayor of Vaihingen an der Enz

Fossils

The ground in and around the city contains rich layers of well-preserved fossils (or Lagerstätten) of the Jurassic period.  The fossils are found in the 180-million-year-old Posidonia Shale and displayed in the local Museum Hauff as well as museums around the world. This locale is important for its frequent preservation of soft tissue, a rarity in fossils.

Examples from this site include:
 Ichthyosaurs
 Plesiosaurs
 Steneosaurus
 Platysuchus
 Lepidotus
 Dapedius
 Ammonite
 Pentacrinus colony (Sea Lily)

References

Mesozoic paleontological sites of Europe
Esslingen (district)
Jurassic paleontological sites